Niaccabana is a monotypic moth genus of the family Erebidae. Its only species, Niaccabana siculipalpis, is found in Taiwan. Both the genus and the species were first described by Strand in 1920.

References

Hypeninae
Monotypic moth genera